Sebastian Wolf (born 1989) is a German Media artist and designer. In his work he explores "novel technologies and their inherent aesthetic and emotional potential" through interactive kinetic and light installations, usually incorporating natural elements. He lives and works in Berlin.

Early life and education 
Wolf holds a BFA in Media Art from Bauhaus University and a postgraduate degree in New Media from Berlin University of the Arts where he studied under Professor Joachim Sauter. He also studied Art & Media at Tama Art University as well as Contemporary Art at Nagoya Zokei University in Japan.

Work 
Wolf's work has been shown internationally, most notably at the  National Museum of Emerging Science and Innovation, Tokyo, the Center for Art and Media Karlsruhe and frequently at the  Ars Electronica Festival, Linz. Other exhibitions include the European Media Art Festival, re:publica, transmediale, and Scopitone Festival.

In 2016 he received the Zebrastraat New Technological Art Award for his work "Brume", a sculpture entirely made of ultralight mist. For his 2019 work "drawhearts", in which a machine utilizes vapour to produce ephemeral hand-drawn heart shapes on a pane of glass, he has been awarded the 2020 New Face Award (Art Division) of the 23rd Japan Media Arts Festival.

References

External links 

 Official website

1989 births
Living people
German artists
Tama Art University alumni
Berlin University of the Arts alumni